William George Moore (April 23, 1931 – November 6, 2002) was a musician and composer from Georgetown, Guyana. Moore had been one of the lead vocalists in the male group The Four Lords.  He died in destitution in 2002 at the Georgetown Public Hospital. It is said of him that he was an icon.

Career
Guyana's musical tradition and popular Culture of Guyana performers include Billy (William) Moore and had been one of the lead vocalists in the male group The Four Lords. Their most popular song was the Guyanese Christmas classic "Happy Holiday". "Happy Holiday" was recorded before the time of record track recording technology. The harmonies were captured live.

Solo
Moore released the single "Love Is Everywhere" with the group Four Lords And Caribbean All Stars, on the label Melodisc Records in April 1979.

Awards
Moore was honored with the Wordsworth McAndrew Award in 2003 for his contributions to the Guyana's cultural life.

References

Sources
 

1931 births
2002 deaths
20th-century composers
20th-century Guyanese male singers
People from Georgetown, Guyana
Recipients of the Wordsworth McAndrew Award